Aum! is a 2021 Indonesian adventure mockumentary film, directed and co-written by Bambang "Ipoenk" Kuntara Mukti in his directorial debut. The film tells a fiction story around the fall of Suharto in 1998.

Premise
Aum! tells about two activists, Satriya and Adam, who fight together with fellow activists to voice the marginalized community whom oppressed by the national government prior to the Reformation in 1998.

Cast

Production
The filming took place in Yogyakarta during the COVID-19 pandemic and followed local COVID-19 safety protocols.

Nichol's portrayal of Satriya and Surya Jatitama is inspired by Budiman Sudjatmiko, a Reformation activist.

Release
Aum! was first announced during the launching of mobile application of the video on demand service Bioskop Online, deemed as its original film, on 1 April 2021. The film was released on 30 September 2021. On its release date, the film and its hashtag "#MengAumHariIni" (lit: Roaring today) trended on Twitter.

References

Indonesian drama films
2021 directorial debut films
2020s mockumentary films
Docudrama films
2020s Indonesian-language films